Augustine Van de Vyver (December 1, 1844 - October 16, 1911) was a Belgian-born American prelate of the Roman Catholic Church.  He served as the sixth bishop of the Diocese of Richmond in Virginia from 1889 to 1911.

Biography

Early life 
Augustine Van de Vyver was born on December 1, 1844, in Haasdonk, Belgium. His parents were John Ferdinand Van de Vyver and Sophia (De Schepper). He attended the St. Joseph Minor Seminary in Sint-Niklaas, Belgium, then went to the American College, Louvain in Leuven, Belgium, from 1867 to 1870. 

Van de Vyver was ordained into the priesthood for the Diocese of Richmond on July 24, 1870 by Archbishop Giacomo Cattani.  After arriving in the United States, he was first assigned as an assistant pastor at St. Peter's Cathedral Parish in Richmond, Virginia.  In 1875, Van de Vyver was appointed as pastor of Sacred Heart of Jesus parish in Harper's Ferry, West Virginia.  While at Sacred Heart, he supervised the completion of a new church in 1878 to replace one destroyed during the American Civil War.  In 1881, he returned to Richmond to become pastor of the cathedral parish and vicar-general of the diocese.

Bishop of Richmond 
Van de Vyver was appointed as bishop of the Diocese of Richmond by Pope Leo XIII on   July 16, 1889.  According to one account, he was reluctant to become bishop, but followed the will of the pope.  Van de Vyver was consecrated on October 20, 1889 by Cardinal James Gibbons, with Bishop James Keane serving as co-consecrator.

In 1901, philanthropist Thomas Fortune Ryan and his wife donated almost $500,000 to buy the land and construct a new Sacred Heart Cathedral in Richmond. It was consecrated on November 29, 1906.  While bishop, Van de Vyver open new religious congregations, schools and other Catholic institutions.  According to his contemporaries, he was very popular among the priests and the parishioners. With assistance from a donor, Van de Vyver opened a industrial college for African-American boys in Rock Castle, Virginia.  Katherine Drexel, mother superior of the Sisters of the Blessed Sacrament. opened a school for African-American girls.

On August 22, 1902, Joseph Anciaux a Belgian Josephite priest in Virginia wrote a letter to the Congregation of the Propaganda in Rome, condemning acceptance by the U.S. Catholic hierarchy of racial segregation in the United States.  He called it a radical and non-Catholic policy, and accused Van de Vyver personally of timidity in the face of "negro haters".  On October 28, 1902, Van de Vyver forced Anciaux to leave the diocese. 

Due to illness, Van de Vyver sent letters of resignation as bishop to the Vatican in 1903 and 1905, but they were denied. He attempted again in 1908,  but the clergy and parishioners in the diocese convinced him to withdraw his request.

Death 
In September 1911, Van de Vyver made a final visit to Belgium to visit his relatives.  By the time he returned to Richmond, Van de Vyver was gravely ill.

Augustin Van de Vyver died on October 16, 1911, in Richmond. He was buried in Mount Calvary Cemetery in Richmond, a cemetery he founded as vicar-general of the diocese.

References

Sources
Magri, The Catholic Church in the City and Diocese of Richmond (Richmond, 1896); 
The Catholic Church in the United States of America (New York, 1909); 
Shea, Our Faith and its Defenders (New York, 1894); 
Catholic Directory (Milwaukee and New York, 1871-1911); 
Diocesan documents and newspaper files (Richmond, 1870-1911).

External links
Catholic Encyclopedia article

1844 births
1911 deaths
Belgian emigrants to the United States
Roman Catholic bishops of Richmond
19th-century Roman Catholic bishops in the United States
20th-century Roman Catholic bishops in the United States